The following outline is provided as an overview of and topical guide to the State of Palestine:

Palestine, a country in the Middle East, is politically under the jurisdiction of the Palestinian government and the Hamas Government in Gaza. Since the Palestinian Declaration of Independence in 1988 and the consequent admission into UN as an observer state in 2012, Palestine is today recognized by three-quarters of the world's countries. Its claimed capital is East Jerusalem, although Ramallah is its internationally recognised capital. Although recently promoted to a non-member state status in the UN, the State of Palestine does not exert full control of its territory and has historically turbulent relations with Israel and much of the west.

General reference 
 Pronunciation: 
 Common English country names: State of Palestine; Palestine
 Common endonym(s): Dawlat Filasṭīn; filasṭīn (also transliterated falasṭīn and filisṭīn)
 Official endonym(s): N/A
 Adjectival(s): Palestinian
 Demonym(s): Palestinian people (aš-šaʿb al-filasṭīnīy), Palestinians (al-filasṭīnīyūn) or Palestinian Arabs (al-ʿarab al-Filasṭīnīyūn)
 Etymology: Timeline of the name Palestine, Place names in Palestine
 ISO country codes:  PS, PSE, 275
 ISO region codes:  See ISO 3166-2:PS
 Internet country code top-level domain:  .ps

Geography of the State of Palestine 

 State of Palestine location:
 Northern Hemisphere and Eastern Hemisphere
 Eurasia
 Asia
 Southwest Asia
 Middle East
 Time zone:  UTC+02, summer UTC+03
 Extreme points of Palestine
 High:  Mount Nabi Yunis 
 Low:  Dead Sea  – lowest point on the surface of the Earth
 Land boundaries:  Officially undefined, figures given are the de facto boundaries of the Green Line as they apply to the West Bank and Gaza Strip (See also Israeli West Bank barrier, Israeli Gaza Strip barrier and the Seam Zone)
 Total: 
 
 
 
 Coastline (Gaza Strip): 
 Coastline (West Bank): 
Note: West Bank includes the northern portion of the Dead Sea with a  shoreline.
 Population of Palestine:
 Palestinian population worldwide, including diaspora: est. 10,000,000 - 11,000,000
 Population of Palestine: est. 3,800,000
 Area of Palestine:
 State of Palestine (post-2013): claimed area  (de facto control of ); The West Bank (including East Jerusalem) is ( and the Gaza Strip is 
 Atlas of Palestine

Environment of Palestine 

 Climate of the State of Palestine
 List of ecoregions in the State of Palestine
 Eastern Mediterranean conifer-sclerophyllous-broadleaf forests
 Renewable energy in Palestine
 Solar cookers in Gaza
 Geology of Palestine
 Jerusalem stone
 Meleke
 Protected areas of Palestine
 Biosphere reserves in Palestine
 National parks of Palestine
 Wildlife of Palestine
 Flora of the State of Palestine
 List of native plants of Palestine (A-D)
 List of native plants of Palestine (E-O)
 List of native plants of Palestine (P-Z)
 Opuntia
 Fauna of Palestine
 Banded newt
 Calopteryx syriaca
 Telescopus hoogstraali
 Birds of Palestine
 Mammals of Palestine
 Marbled polecat
 Striped hyena
 Palestinian Environmental NGOs Network

Natural geographic features of Palestine 

 Glaciers of Palestine: N/A
 Islands of Palestine: N/A
 Lakes of Palestine
 List of seas in Palestine
 Dead Sea
 Mediterranean Sea
 Mountains of Palestine
 Volcanoes in Palestine
 Rivers of Palestine
 Jordan River
 Water politics in the Jordan River basin
 Headwater Diversion Plan (Jordan River)
 Wadi Fa'rah
 Waterfalls of Palestine
 Wells of Palestine
 Jubb Yussef (Joseph's Well)
 Valleys of Palestine
 Jordan Rift Valley
 Jordan Valley
 Wadi Qelt
 Villages named for Wadis ("Valleys")
 Wadi al-Arayis
 Wadi Ara, Haifa (depopulated in 1948)
 Wadi al-Far'a
 Wadi Fukin

Regions of Palestine 

Regions of the State of Palestine

Ecoregions of Palestine 

List of ecoregions in Palestine

Administrative divisions of Palestine 
 West Bank Areas in the Oslo II Accord

Administrative divisions of the State of Palestine 
 Palestinian Governorates: 16 (11 in the West Bank, 5 in Gaza)
 Jerusalem Governorate: Jerusalem District
 Bethlehem Governorate: Bethlehem District
 Deir Al-Balah Governorate: Deir Al-Balah District
 Gaza Governorate: Gaza District
 Hebron Governorate: Hebron District
 Jenin Governorate: Jenin District
 Jericho Governorate: Jericho District
 Khan Yunis Governorate: Khan Younis District
 Nablus Governorate: Nablus District
 North Gaza Governorate: North Gaza District
 Qalqilya Governorate: Qalqilya District
 Rafah Governorate: Rafah District
 Ramallah and Al-Bireh Governorate: Ramallah and Al-Bireh District
 Salfit Governorate: Salfit District
 Tubas Governorate: Tubas District
 Tulkarm Governorate: Tulkarm District
 Cities under Palestinian administration
List of cities in the Gaza Strip

Demography of Palestine 
 Demographics of Palestine
 Palestinian Central Bureau of Statistics

Government and politics of Palestine 

 Form of government: semi-presidential parliamentary democracy

 Capital of Palestine:
 Proclaimed capital: East Jerusalem (also proclaimed by Israel)
 de facto capital: Ramallah
 Elections in Palestine
 Palestinian government
Palestinian government of 2013
Palestinian unity government of 2014
 List of political parties in the State of Palestine
 Political parties of the PLO
 Taxation in Palestine

Branches of the government of Palestine 

President of the State of Palestine: Mahmoud Abbas
Prime Minister of the State of Palestine: Rami Hamdallah
NB. As a result of the Fatah-Hamas conflict, there is a dispute over the Presidency and Prime Ministership of the State of Palestine.
Ministries of Palestine
Education Ministry
Foreign Affairs Ministry
Finance Ministry
Health Ministry
Interior Ministry
Planning Ministry

Legislative branches of the government of Palestine 
Palestinian Legislative Council (Palestine, unicameral)
Palestinian National Council (PLO, unicameral, parliament-in-exile)

Judicial branch of the government of Palestine 
According to the Constitution of Palestine, all courts relating to the country shall be independent.

Local governance in Palestine 
 Local governance in Palestine
 Mukataa

Foreign relations of Palestine 
Foreign relations of Palestine
 Holy See – Palestinian relations
 India-Palestine relations
 Iran-Palestine relations
 Palestine-Russia relations
 Pakistan-Palestine relations
 Romania-Palestine relations
 Diplomatic missions in Palestine
 List of diplomatic missions of the State of Palestine

Palestine and the United Nations 

 United Nations Partition Plan for Palestine
 United Nations Palestine Commission
 United Nations Relief and Works Agency for Palestine Refugees in the Near East (UNRWA)
 United Nations resolutions concerning Palestine
 United Nations Special Committee on Palestine (UNSCOP)
 Committee on the Exercise of the Inalienable Rights of the Palestinian People
 United Nations Division for Palestinian Rights (UNDPR)
 International Day of Solidarity with the Palestinian People
 Palestinian right of return
 Palestine and the United Nations

International organization membership 

Palestine is a member in a number of international organizations. In others, it enjoys affiliation in a lesser capacity or under another designation (such as PLO or Palestinian National Authority). In the list below, if the membership is not full or not for the state of Palestine, the type and name of affiliation is denoted in parentheses.

 Arab Fund for Economic and Social Development (AFESD)
 Arab League (AL)
 Arab Monetary Fund (AMF)
 Council of Arab Economic Unity (CAEU)
 FIFA (Asian Football Confederation (AFC)
 Group of 77 (G77)
 International Olympic Committee (IOC)
 International Trade Union Confederation (ITUC) (affiliate member)
 International Telecommunication Union (ITU) (non-voting observer status)
 International Organization for Standardization (ISO) 
 International Paralympic Committee (IPC)
 International Federation of Red Cross and Red Crescent Societies (IFRC)
 International Committee of the Red Cross (ICRC)
 Islamic Development Bank (IDC)
 Organisation of Islamic Cooperation (OIC)
 Non-Aligned Movement (NAM)
 United Nations (UN) (observer)
 Asian Group of the United Nations
 United Nations Economic and Social Commission for Western Asia (UNESCWA)
 UNESCO
 UNIDO
 Universal Postal Union (UPU) 
 World Health Organization (WHO) (observer status) (see also: Palestine's application to the WHO)
 World Intellectual Property Organization (WIPO)
 OPCW
 ICC
 Interpol
 UNCTAD
 UNICEF
 IPU

International aid to Palestine 
 International aid to Palestinians

International solidarity movements 
 Palestinian solidarity organizations

Law and order in Palestine 

Palestinian Law
 Palestinian National Charter
 Crime in Palestine
 Human rights in Palestine
 Freedom of religion in Palestine
 LGBT rights in Palestine
 Polygamy in Palestine
 Human rights organizations in Palestine
 Al Mezan Center for Human Rights
 Palestinian Centre for Human Rights
 Palestinian Human Rights Monitoring Group
 Human rights record of Israel in the Palestinian Territories
 International law and Israeli settlements
 Israeli targeted killings
 Law enforcement in Palestine
 Prostitution in Palestine

Military of Palestine 

Military of the State of Palestine
 Command
 Commander-in-chief: N/A
 Ministry of Defense of Palestine: N/A
 Forces
 Army of the Palestine: N/A
 Navy of the Palestine: N/A
 Air Force of the Palestine: N/A
 Special forces of Palestine:
 Military history of Palestine
 Arab Liberation Army
 Army of the Holy War
 Military ranks of Palestine: N/A

Paramilitary forces of Palestine 

Palestinian National Security Forces
 Preventive Security Force

Irregular Palestinian forces 
 Al-Aqsa Martyrs' Brigades (armed wing affiliated with Fatah)
 al-Quds Brigades (armed wing of Palestinian Islamic Jihad)
 Izz ad-Din al-Qassam Brigades (armed wing of Hamas)
 Popular Front for the Liberation of Palestine - General Command (PFLP-GC) (armed wing of the PFLP)
 Popular Resistance Committees
 Palestinian domestic weapons production
 Qassam rocket
 al-Quds rocket
 Rocket and mortar attacks on southern Israel
 Yassin RPG
 Al-Bana RPG
 Batar RPG

 International civilian organizations in Palestine 

 European Union Border Assistance Mission Rafah
 European Union Police Mission for the Palestinian Territories
 Temporary International Presence in Hebron

 History of Palestine 

 Postage stamps and postal history of Palestine
 Military history of Palestine
 Sinai and Palestine Campaign (1915–1918)
 Battle of Megiddo (1918)
 1920 Palestine riots
 Jaffa riots
 1929 Palestine riots
 1936–1939 Arab revolt in Palestine
 Bombing of Palestine in World War II
 1948 Palestine war
 1948 Palestinian exodus
 1949–56 Palestinian exodus
 Kfar Qasim massacre
 1967 War
 1967 Palestinian exodus
 Battle of Karameh
 Black September in Jordan (1970)
 Lebanese Civil War
 1982 Lebanon War
 Sabra and Shatila massacre
 Second Intifada (2000–05)
 Battle of Jenin (2002)
 Battle of Nablus (2002)
 Siege of the Church of the Nativity in Bethlehem (2002)
 Gaza–Israel conflict
 Political history of Palestine
 Partitioning of the Ottoman Empire
 History of the Israeli–Palestinian conflict
 British Mandate Palestine
 Arab Higher Committee
 All-Palestine Government
 Palestine Liberation Organization
 Israeli–Palestinian peace process
 Palestinian National Authority
 Road map for peace

 Palestinian culture 

Palestinian culture

 Archaeology in the State of Palestine
 Gaza Museum of Archaeology
 Architecture of Palestine
 Abd al-Hadi Palace
 Hisham's Palace
 Jacir Palace
 Khan al-Tujjar (Nablus)
 Khirbat al-Minya
 Manara Clock Tower
 Qasr al-Basha
 Palestinian costumes
 Palestinian cuisine
 Festivals of the State of Palestine
 Al-Quds Capital of Arab Culture
 Boston Palestine Film Festival
 Chicago Palestine Film Festival
 Feast of Saint George
 Khader Grape Festival
 Thursday of the Dead
 Palestine Festival of Literature
 Nabi Musa (pre-1948)
 Nabi Rubin (pre-1948)
 Al-Nabi Yusha' (pre-1948)
 Languages of Palestine
 Palestinian Arabic
 Communications in Palestine
 Print media of the State of Palestine
 Al-Ayyam
 Al-Hadaf
 Electronic Intifada
 Gaza Weekly Newspaper
 Al-Hayat al-Jadida
 Al-Hurriya
 International Middle East Media Center
 Al-Karmil
 Palestine News Network
 Palestine Times
 Al-Quds
 Al-Quds Al-Arabi
 Sawt al-Jamahir
 Palestinian Broadcasting Corporation
 Radio in Palestine
 Near East Broadcasting Station
 RAM FM (West Bank)
 Voice of Palestine
 Television in the State of Palestine
 Al Aqsa TV
 Palestinian Satellite Channel
 National symbols of Palestine
 Coat of arms of Palestine
 Palestinian Flag
 Keffiyeh
 National anthem of Palestine
 Palestinian nationalism
 Sumud
 Palestinians
 Internally displaced Palestinians
 Palestinian diaspora
 Palestinian prisoners in Israel
 Palestinian refugees
 Prominent Palestinians
 National holidays of the State of Palestine
 Land Day
 Nakba Day
 Naksa Day
 Records of Palestine
 Religion in Palestine
 Christianity in Palestine
 Eastern Orthodox
 Greek Orthodox Church
 Brotherhood of the Holy Sepulchre
 Greek Orthodox Patriarch of Jerusalem
 Arab Orthodox
 Church of the Nativity
 Church of Saint Porphyrius
 Monastery of Saint George, al-Khader
 Monastery of the Temptation
 Oriental Orthodoxy
 Armenian Patriarch of Jerusalem
 Latin Rite
 Latin Patriarch of Jerusalem
 Church of Saint Lazarus
 Eastern Catholic Churches
 Melkite Greek Catholic Church
 Anglican Communion
 Episcopal Church in Jerusalem and the Middle East
 Anglican-German Bishopric in Jerusalem
 Anglican Bishop of Jerusalem
 Protestantism
 Presbyterianism
 Sabeel
 Church of Scotland
 St Andrew's Church, Jerusalem
 Church of the Holy Sepulcher
 Islam in Palestine
 Ahmadiyya in Palestine
 Waqf
 Jerusalem Islamic Waqf
 Haram al-Sharif
 Al-Aqsa Mosque
 Dome of the Rock
 Dome of the Chain
 Excavations at the Temple Mount
 Imaret
 Hasseki Sultan Imaret
 Moroccan Quarter
 Sabil Abu Nabbut
 List of mosques in Palestine
 Great Mosque of Gaza
 Great Mosque of Nablus
 Al-Hamadiyya Mosque
 Ibn Marwan Mosque
 Ibn Uthman Mosque
 Al-Khadra Mosque
 Mahmoudiya Mosque
 Mosque of Omar (Bethlehem)
 An-Nasr Mosque
 Sayed al-Hashim Mosque
 Sultan Ibrahim Ibn Adham Mosque
 Umm al-Naser Mosque
 Welayat Mosque
 Supreme Muslim Council
 Sites holy to Christians, Jews, and Muslims
 Cave of the Patriarchs (Al-Haram Al-Ibrahimi'')
 Joseph's Tomb
 Jacob's Well (also holy to Samaritans)
 Rachel's Tomb (Bilal ibn Rabah)
 Tomb of Samuel (Nabi Samwil)
 Judaism in Palestine
Palestinian synagogues
Ancient Synagogue of Gaza
 Samaritans in Palestine
 Ahmadiyya in Palestine

Art in Palestine 
 Palestinian art
 Museums in Palestine
 Badd Giacaman Museum
 Baituna al-Talhami Museum
 Cinema of the State of Palestine
 Cinema Jenin
 Palestinian handicrafts
 Palestinian literature
 Music of Palestine
 Ataaba
 The Edward Said National Conservatory of Music
 Palestinian hip hop
 Palestinian Theatre
 Al-Kasaba Theatre
 Palestinian National Theatre

Sports in Palestine 

Sport in Palestine
 Football in the State of Palestine
 Palestine national football team
 Palestinian Football Federation
 Faisal Al-Husseini International Stadium
 Palestine Stadium
 Hammams (bathhouses)
 Hamam al-Sammara
 Palestine Olympic Committee
 Palestine at the Olympics
 Palestine at the Paralympics
 Palestinian Scout Association
 Girl Guides of Palestine

Economy and infrastructure of Palestine 
 Economy of Palestine
Economy of Gaza

 Economic rank, by nominal GDP (2007): 134th (one hundred and thirty fourth)
 Agriculture in Palestine
 Banking in Palestine
 Arab Bank
 National Bank of Palestine
 Communications in Palestine
 Internet in Palestine
 Telephone numbers in the State of Palestine
 List of companies of Palestine
 G.ho.st
 Palestinian Airlines (defunct)
 Paltel
 Taybeh Brewery
 National Trade Union of Palestine
 Fair Trade organizations in the State of Palestine
 Canaan Fair Trade
 Palestine Fair Trade Association
 Zaytoun
Currency of Palestine: dinar/sheqel
 ISO 4217: JOD/ILS
 Energy in the State of Palestine
 Mining in the State of Palestine
 Public squares in Palestine
 Manger Square
 Palestine Square
 Soldier's Square
 Tourism in Palestine
 Alternative Tourism Group
 Transport in Palestine
 List of airports in Palestine
 Yasser Arafat International Airport (1998–2001)
 Rail transport in the State of Palestine
 Port of Gaza
 Roads in Palestine
 Highway 57
 Omar Mukhtar Street
 Star Street
 Wehda Street
 Water supply and sanitation in Palestine
 Palestine Stock Exchange

Healthcare in Palestine 
 Health care in Palestine
 Palestine Red Crescent Society
 Augusta Victoria Hospital
 Al-Shifa Hospital

Housing in Palestine 
 Housing in Palestine
 House demolition in the Israeli–Palestinian conflict
 Palestinian refugee camps

Education in the Palestine 

 Education in Palestine
 Education Ministry
 Universities and colleges of Palestine
 Student organizations in Palestine
 General Union of Palestinian Students
 Palestinian Youth Association for Leadership and Rights Activation
 Progressive Student Labor Front
 Students Liberation Bloc
 Student organizations supporting Palestine
 Palestinian cultural club
 Palestine Solidarity Movement
 Solidarity for Palestinian Human Rights

Books on Palestine 
 Correcting a Mistake: Jews and Arabs in Palestine/Israel, 1936-1956
 The Ethnic Cleansing of Palestine
 Palestine (comics)
 Palestine Peace Not Apartheid
 Underground to Palestine

See also 

List of international rankings
List of Palestine-related topics
Years in Palestine
Outline of Asia
Outline of geography
Outline of Israel

References

Bibliography

External links 

The Hope Simpson Report (London, 1930) 
Palestine Royal Commission Report (the Peel Report) (London, 1937) 
Report to the Council of the League of Nations (1928) 
Report to the Council of the League of Nations (1929) 
Report to the Council of the League of Nations (1934) 
Report to the Council of the League of Nations (1935) 
www.mideastweb.org - A website with a wealth of statistics regarding population in Palestine
Coins and Banknotes of Palestine under the British Mandate
WorldStatesmen- Maps, flags, chronology, see Israel and Palestinian National Authority
hWeb - Israel-Palestine in Maps
Palestine Fact Sheet from the Common Language Project

Liberal Democrat Friends of Palestine
History of the Palestine Problem, UN website

Maps
Sykes-Picot Agreement, 1916
1947 UN Partition Plan
1949 Armistice Lines
Israel After 1949 Armistice Agreements
Liberal Democrat Friends of Palestine

Palestine
Palestine
Outline